Ectoedemia phyllotomella is a moth of the family Nepticulidae. It is only known from Liguria and Lucania in northern Italy.

The wingspan is 4.6-5.2 mm. Adults are on wing from April to May. There is one generation per year.

The larvae feed on Quercus cerris. They mine the leaves of their host plant. The mine consists of  a narrow corridor running along the midrib or a side vein. Later the corridor becomes free and then is strongly contorted, often forming a secondary blotch. The frass is concentrated in a central line. When fully grown, the larva makes an oval excision in the mine, and pupates there. The excision only drops out of the mine with the withering of the leaf.

External links
Fauna Europaea
bladmineerders.nl
A Taxonomic Revision Of The Western Palaearctic Species Of The Subgenera Zimmermannia Hering And Ectoedemia Busck s.str. (Lepidoptera, Nepticulidae), With Notes On Their Phylogeny

Nepticulidae
Moths described in 1946
Endemic fauna of Italy
Moths of Europe